Gustaf Fröding (22 August 1860 – 8 February 1911) was a Swedish poet and writer, born in Alster outside Karlstad in Värmland. The family moved to Kristinehamn in the year 1867. He later studied at Uppsala University and worked as a journalist in Karlstad.

Poetry
His poetry combines formal virtuosity with a sympathy for the ordinary, the neglected and the down-trodden, sometimes written in his own regional dialect. It is highly musical and lends itself to musical setting; many of his poems have been set to music and recorded by Swedish singers such as Olle Adolphson, Monica Zetterlund, the Värmland group Sven-Ingvars and the Swedish band Mando Diao. 

Fröding wrote openly about his personal problems with alcohol and women and had to face a trial for obscenity.

Sickness 

The latter part of his life he spent in different mental institutions and hospitals to cure his mental illness and alcoholism, and eventually diabetes. During the first half of the 1890s he spent a couple of years at the Suttestad institution in Lillehammer, Norway, where he finished his work on his third book of poetry Stänk och flikar, which was published in 1896. He wrote much of the material at a mental institution in Görlitz, Germany. In 1896 he moved back to Sweden. But as the year neared Christmas, his sister Cecilia made the difficult decision to make him stay at a hospital in Uppsala. Under the care of professor Frey Svenson Fröding got away from liquor and women, except one, Ida Bäckman. To this day, people think that Ida Bäckman wanted to marry Fröding and corrupt him in some way. Later she wrote books but they were always judged harshly and never got good reviews. She is about to have her name cleared in Sweden. Fröding never married Ida. She was never asked to stop visiting Fröding by professor Svenson and Cecilia Fröding. Instead Fröding grew fond of a nurse named Signe Trotzig. When he left hospital in Uppsala she stayed with him to the day he died.

A play by Swedish playwright Gottfrid Grafström, called Sjung vackert om kärlek, about Fröding's time at the mental institution in Uppsala was first performed at Dramaten in 1973 and has had periodic revivals since.

Selected works 
Gitarr och dragharmonika (Guitar and concertina) 1891 
Nya dikter (New poems) 1893
Räggler å paschaser (Tall tales and adventures) 1895 
Stänk och flikar (Splashes and spray) 1896 
Nytt och gammalt (New and old) 1897 
Gralstänk (Splashes of the grail) 1898 
Efterskörd (Gleanings) 1910
Reconvalescentia (Convalescence) 1914
Samlade skrifter 1-16 (Collected works 1-16) 1917–1922
Brev till en ung flicka (Letters to a young girl) 1952  
Äventyr i Norge (Adventures in Norway) 1963
Gustaf Frödings brev, 2 vol. (Gustaf Fröding's letters, 2 vol.) 1981-1982
"23 Bojaere"*

His works in English 
Poems 1903  
Selected Poems 1916  
Guitar and Concertina 1925  
Gustaf Fröding: His Life and Poetry 1986  
Swedes On Love CD 1991  
The Selected Poems of Gustaf Fröding 1993  
The Complete Poems of Gustaf Fröding 1997-1999  
The North! To the North! 2001

References

External links 

 
  
 
Swedish

Gustaf Fröding at Open Library.
Gustaf Fröding at Project Runeberg.
Gustaf Fröding at Swedish Wikisource.
Gustaf Fröding at Uppsala University.
Samlade Skrifter at the Internet Archive.
English
Gustaf Fröding at PoemHunter
Three poems by Gustaf Fröding

The uncrowned king of Swedish poetry
Gustaf Fröding at the Encyclopædia Britannica
  
Translations
Selected Poems by Gustaf Fröding at the Internet Archive.
Guitar and accordion (Gitarr och dragharmonika)
A love song (En kärleksvisa)
A love song and A ghazal (En ghasel)
The old mountain troll (Ett gammalt bergtroll)
Streaming audio
Fröding verse and prose
Räggler å paschaser      
Videos

 Song begins at 3:24 of medley.

1860 births
1911 deaths
People from Karlstad Municipality
Writers from Värmland
Swedish-language poets
Uppsala University alumni
Burials at Uppsala old cemetery
Swedish male poets
19th-century Swedish poets
19th-century male writers
20th-century Swedish poets
20th-century Swedish male writers